Carex gunniana is an Australia species of sedge that was first described in 1845 by Boott in the Proceedings of the Linnean Society of London. It is native to eastern Australia and Tasmania.

Two varieties have been named, both in 1909 by Georg Kükenthal. , the Tasmanian endemic Carex gunniana var. barbata is maintained as a separate species, Carex barbata, in Kew's Plants of the World Online, and C. gunniana var. brevior is not accepted as a separate taxon than C. gunniana.

References

gunniana
Endemic flora of Australia
Plants described in 1845